The name Dionysius (Dionysios, "of Dionysus") was common in classical and post-classical times. Etymologically it is a nominalized adjective formed with a -ios suffix from the stem Dionys- of the name of the Greek god, Dionysus, parallel to Apollon-ios from Apollon, with meanings of Dionysos' and Apollo's, etc. The exact beliefs attendant on the original assignment of such names remain unknown.

Regardless of the language of origin of Dionysos and Apollon, the -ios/-ius suffix is associated with a full range of endings of the first and second declension in the Greek and Latin languages. The names may thus appear in ancient writing in any of their cases. Dionysios itself refers only to males. The feminine version of the name is Dionysia, nominative case, in both Greek and Latin. The name of the plant and the festival, Dionysia, is the neuter plural nominative, which looks the same in English from both languages. Dionysiou is the masculine and neuter genitive case of the Greek second declension. Dionysias is not the -ios suffix.

Although in most cases transmuted, the name remains in many modern languages, such as English Dennis (Denys, Denis, Denise). The latter names have lost the suffix altogether, using Old French methods of marking the feminine, Denise. The modern Greek (closest to the original) is Dionysios or Dionysis. The Spanish is Dionisio. The Italian is Dionigi and last name, Dionisi. Like Caesar in secular contexts, Dionysius sometimes became a title in religious contexts; for example, Dionysius was the episcopal title of the primates of Malankara Church (founded by Apostle Thomas in India) from 1765 until the amalgamation of that title with Catholicos of the East in 1934.

People named Dionysius

Secular classical contexts

Athletics 
 Dionysius of Alexandria (athlete), fl. 129 AD, last winner of the stadion race at the Olympic Games of the times

Science and philosophy 
 Dionysius of Chalcedon, fl. 320 BC, philosopher of Megarian school
 Dionysius of Cyrene, Stoic philosopher and mathematician, c. 150 BC
 Dionysius of Lamptrai, 3rd century BC, an Epicurean philosopher and head of the "Garden"
 Dionysius Periegetes, Greek geographer, 2nd or 3rd century
 Dionysius the Renegade, Stoic philosopher from Heraclea who became a Cyrenaic, c. 300 BC

Letters 
 Cassius Dionysius, 2nd cent. BC, Greek agricultural writer
 Aelius Dionysius, a Greek rhetorician from Halicarnassus (fl. early 2nd century)
 Dionysius Chalcus, Athenian elegiac poet, 5th century BC
 Dionysius of Halicarnassus (c. 60 BC – after 7 BC), Greek historian of the Roman period
 Dionysius of Miletus, Greek ethnographer and historian (fl. perhaps in the 5th century BC)
 Dionysius Thrax, Greek grammarian, 2nd century BC

Politics 
 Dion of Syracuse, 408-354 BC, tyrant of Syracuse
 Dionysius (ambassador), 3rd century BC, ambassador to the court of the Indian ruler Ashoka
 Dionysius (Athenian Commander), an Athenian naval commander during the Corinthian War
 Dionysius I of Syracuse (c. 432 – 367 BC), also called Dionysius the Elder, ruler of Syracuse in Sicily
 Dionysius II of Syracuse (c. 397 BC – 343 BC), also called Dionysius the Younger, son of the preceding
 Dionysius of Heraclea, tyrant of Heraclea Pontica, 4th century BC
 Dionysius of Phocaea, commander of the Ionian fleet at the Battle of Lade, 494 BC
 Lucius Aelius Helvius Dionysius, 4th century, Roman Proconsul and Praefectus Urbi
 Dionysios Soter, r. 65-55 BC, Indo-Greek king in the area of eastern Punjab

Christian contexts

Before 1000 AD 
 Dionysius the Areopagite, Athenian judge who was converted by Paul of Tarsus and became Bishop of Athens
 Dionysius of Vienne, d. 193, Bishop of Vienne, Gaul
 Dionysius, Bishop of Corinth, 2nd-century bishop
 Faustus, Abibus and Dionysius of Alexandria, d. 250, three Christian martyrs
 Dionysius, 3rd-century Christian martyr and saint, noted in Theodore, Philippa and companions
 Pope Dionysius of Alexandria, 3rd-century Egyptian bishop
 Pope Dionysius, 259–268
 Dionysius (bishop of Milan), also called Dionysius of Milan, bishop of Milan 349-355, saint
 Pseudo-Dionysius the Areopagite (5th century), name claimed by a pseudonymous writer, identified by some with Georgian theologian Peter the Iberian (411–491), author of Corpus Areopagiticum
 Dionysius Exiguus (c. 470–c. 540), monk from Scythia Minor who invented the Anno Domini era
 Dionysius I Telmaharoyo (d. 848), Syriac Orthodox patriarch of Antioch
 Dionysius II of Antioch (d. 908/909), Syriac Orthodox patriarch of Antioch

1000 AD to before 1600 AD 
 Dionysius (Zbyruyskyy), d. 1603, first Ukrainian Catholic bishop
 Dionysius (Archdeacon of Aghadoe), 12th cent., first recorded Archdeacon of Aghadoe
 Jacob Bar-Salibi also known as Dionysius Bar-salibi, member of Syrian Jacobite Church in the 12th century, best known for his commentary on biblical texts
 Dionysius bar Masih, d. 1204, illegitimate Maphrian of the East of the Syriac Orthodox Church
 Dionysius, Metropolitan of Kiev (c. 1300–1385), 14th century orthodox prelate
 Dionysius (Dean of Armagh), Irish cleric, Dean of Armagh 1301–1330
 Dionysius I of Constantinople, Saint, reigned from 1466 to 1471 and from 1488 to 1490
 Dionisius (late 15th century–early 16th century), also called Dionysius the Wise, Russian medieval icon-painter
 Dionysios Skylosophos (1560 AD–1611 AD), Epirotian Greek monk who led two farmer revolts against the Ottoman Turks
 Dionysius Ó Donnchadha, 1441-1478, Bishop of Kilmacduagh
 Dionysius Ó Mórdha, d. 1534, Bishop of Clonfert, Ireland
 Dionysius Part, d. 1475, auxiliary Bishop of Mainz
 Dionysius II of Constantinople, reigned from 1546 to 1556
 Saint Dionysios of Zakynthos, 15th century Orthodox Christian Archbishop of Aegina

1600 AD and after 
 Blessed Dionysius of the Nativity, French sailor, Portuguese knight, and Carmelite martyr
 Dionysius of Fourna, 1670-1744, Christian monk and author
 Dionysios Mantoukas, 1648-1751, the Greek Orthodox bishop of Kastoria, Western Macedonia, modern Greece, from 1694 to 1719
 Mar Dionysius I (died 1808), also known as Mar Dionysius the Great or Marthoma VI, Metropolitan of the Malankara Church (in India)
 Pulikkottil Joseph Mar Dionysious II, 1833-1909, Malankara Metropolitan
 Geevarghese Mar Dionysius of Vattasseril (1858-1934), also known as Mar Dionysius VI, Metropolitan of Malankara Church (in India), Saint
 Dionysius Kfoury, 1879-1965, bishop of the Melkite Greek Catholic Archeparchy of Alexandria
 Dionysios Bairaktaris, 1927-2011, Greek Orthodox metropolitan bishop of Chios, Psara, and Inousses
 Dionysios Mantalos, 1952-, current Metropolitan bishop of Corinth

Modern contexts

Athletics 
 Dionisis Angelopoulos, 1992-, Greek rower
 Dionysios Dimou, Olympic sailor
 Dionysios Georgakopoulos, 1963-, Greek sport shooter
 Dionysios Iliadis, Greek judoka, or Judo competitor
 Dionysios Kasdaglis, 1872-1931, Greek-Egyptian tennis player
 Dionysios Vasilopoulos, 1902-1964, Greek swimmer
 Dionysius Hayom Rumbaka, 1988-, Indonesian badminton player
 Dionysius Sebwe, 1969-, retired Liberian athlete

Fine arts 
 Dionysio Miseroni, 1607-1661, Bohemian jeweler and stonecutter
 Dionysios Demetis, Greek composer
 Dionysios Solomos, 1798-1857, author of Greek Hymn to Liberty.
 Dionysios Tsokos, 1814-1862, Greek painter
 Dionysios Vegias, 1810-1884, Greek painter of the later Heptanese School
 Dionysis Makris, Greek singer
 Dionysis Papagiannopoulos, Greek actor
 Dionysis Savvopoulos, Greek songwriter, lyricist and singer
 Dionysius Rodotheatos, 1849-1892, Greek conductor and composer
 Georg Dionysius Ehret, 1708-1770, botanical illustrator
 Stratos Dionysiou, 1935-1990, a Greek laika and elafro-laika singer

Letters 
 B. R. Dionysius, 1969-, Australian poet, editor, arts administrator and educator
 Benjamin Musaphia (1606–1675), Jewish doctor, scholar, and kabbalist, who sometimes called himself Dionysius
 Dionysios Kokkinos, 1884-1967, Greek historian and writer
 Dionysios Solomos (1798–1857), Greek poet
 Dionysios Zakythinos, 1905-1993, Greek Byzantinist
 Dionysius Andreas Freher, 1649-1728, commentator on Jacob Boehme
 Dionysius Godefridus van der Keessel, 1738-1816, Dutch jurist and educator to the royal house
 Dionysius Lardner (1793–1859), Irish scientific writer
 Dionysius Vossius, 1612-1635, Dutch translator

Science 
 Dionysios Ikkos, 1921-1993, Greek endocrinologist

Politics 
 Dionysia-Theodora Avgerinopoulou (born 1975), Greek lawyer and politician
 Dionysius Adrianus Petrus Norbertus Koolen, 1871-1945, Dutch politician
 Dionysis Diakos, Greek revolutionary leader in the Greek War of Independence
 Dionysius Wakering (born 1617), English Parliamentarian

See also 
 Denis
 Dionysos (disambiguation)
 Patriarch Dionysius (disambiguation)
 Dionysius III (disambiguation)

References

External links 
 
 

Given names of Greek language origin
Latin masculine given names
Theophoric names
Dionysus